Cool Ruler is a 1978 studio album by Gregory Isaacs, his first released on the Virgin Records subsidiary Front Line. The Jamaican release was on Isaacs' African Museum imprint. The album was produced by Isaacs and mixed by Lancelot "Maxie" McKenzie at Channel One Studios in Kingston, Jamaica. Of the tracks on the album, "Let's Dance" had previously been released as a single. Some of the tracks on the album are considered among the best ever recorded by Isaacs, although the album failed to give him the international breakthrough that had been anticipated. The album title did, however, endure as Isaacs' nickname. "John Public" was also released as a single. The album formed the basis of the dub album Slum in Dub, released the same year. Cool Ruler was reissued on compact disc by Virgin in 2000.

Track listing 
All tracks by Gregory Isaacs except where noted

 "Native Woman" – 3:02 
 "John Public" – 3:06
 "Party in the Slum" – 3:26
 "Uncle Joe" – 3:50
 "World of the Farmer" – 4:08
 "One More Time" – 3:14
 "Let's Dance" (John Holt) – 2:56 
 "Don't Pity Me" – 2:22
 "Created by the Father" (Dennis Brown) – 2:31
 "Raving Tonight" – 3:57

Personnel 
 Gregory Isaacs - vocals
 The Heptones - backing vocals  
 The Revolutionaries - backing band  
 Sly Dunbar - drums
 Robbie Shakespeare, Ernest Wilson - bass
 Eric "Bingy Bunny" Lamont, Earl "Chinna" Smith, Ranchie McLean - guitar
 Ansel Collins - keyboards
 Bobby Ellis - trumpet
Tommy McCook - tenor saxophone
Herman Marquis - alto saxophone
Technical
Lancelot "Maxie" McKenzie - engineer
Armet Francis - sleeve
Dave Hendley - photography

References 

1978 albums
Gregory Isaacs albums